Cayman Islands participated in the 2010 Summer Youth Olympics in Singapore.

The Cayman Islands team consisted of 3 athletes competing in 2 sports: sailing and swimming.

Sailing

One Person Dinghy

Swimming

References

External links
Competitors List: Cayman Islands

Nations at the 2010 Summer Youth Olympics
2010 in Caymanian sport
Cayman Islands at the Youth Olympics